Patrick Moylett (1878–1973) was a 20th-century Irish nationalist who, during the initial armistice negotiations to end the Anglo-Irish war, briefly served as president of the Irish Republican Brotherhood during late-1920. A successful businessman in County Mayo and County Galway, he was a close associate of Arthur Griffith and frequently travelled to London acting as a middleman between Sinn Féin and officials in the British government. He ran a business that was used as a front to import armaments for the cause and held that many of those that became closest associates of Éamon de Valera during the civil war rift had at one time worked for the British. Particularly that Erskine Childers despite his involvement with the Asgard and his close association with Éamon de Valera had been in the direct pay of the Admiralty Naval Intelligence Service up till 1916 before becoming secretary to the Éamon de Valera led treaty discussions.

Biography

Revolutionary Period
Born in Crossmolina, County Mayo to a farming family, Moylett emigrated to London as a young man working in various departments in Harrods for five years before returning to Ireland in 1902. He opened a grocery and provisions business in Ballina and, as it proved successful, he later established branches in Galway and London between 1910 and 1914; the London-branch would be sold at the outbreak of the First World War. Having founded and organised the recruitment and funding of the Mayo activities of the IRA he also acted as a justice of the Sinn Féin courts. He was advised to leave the area due to death threats from the Black and Tans and their burning down of his commercial premises in Ballina. On one occasion during that period, according to his military statements, he prevented some over-enthusiastic volunteers from attempting the kidnapping and assassination of Prince George Future King of England, sailing and holidaying in the Mayo/Donegal region at the time. Relocating to Dublin, the Irish overseas Trading Company was formed with a former Director of ICI Chemicals & Explosives, he became involved in the Irish nationalist movement and was active in the Mayo and Galway areas during the Irish War of Independence. The Irish Overseas Trading Company, of which Moylett was one of two directors; acted as a front for the importation of armaments covered by consignments of trade goods. According to his subsequent detailed military statements archived in the bureau of military history by the Irish Army, the consignments were imported to a number of warehouses in the Dublin Docks with the three keyholders to the warehouses being Éamon de Valera, Michael Collins and Arthur Griffith.

With Harry Boland in the United States with Éamon de Valera, Moylett succeeded him as president of the Irish Republican Brotherhood and, in October 1920, he was selected to go to London as the personal envoy of Arthur Griffith. During the next several months, Moylett was involved in secret discussions with British government officials on the recognition of Dáil Éireann, a general amnesty for members of the Irish Republican Army and the organisation of a peace conference to end hostilities between both parties.

He was assisted by John Steele, the London editor of the Chicago Tribune, who helped him contact high-level members of the British Foreign Office. One of these officials, in particular C.J. Phillps, had frequent meetings with him. These meetings were later attended by H. A. L. Fisher, the Minister of Education and one of the most outspoken opponents of unauthorised reprisals against the Irish civilian population by the British government. One of the main points Fisher expressed to Moylett was the necessity of Sinn Féin to compromise on its demands for a free and united republic. His efforts were hindered however, both to the slow and confused pace of the peace negotiations as well as the regularly occurring violence in Ireland, most especially the Bloody Sunday incident on 21 November 1920, which happened whilst he was in London speaking with members of the cabinet.
During the Irish Civil War, although a supporter of the Anglo-Irish Treaty, he chose not to participate in the Free State government party which he viewed as an amalgam of Unionists and the old Irish Party. In 1926 he a founding member of the Clann Éireann Party and became an early advocate of the withholding of land annuities.

During "the Emergency" Period
In 1930 Moylett and his family moved to Dublin, and by 1940 his political activities in the city had become a concern for the Gardai. Moylett had begun moving in anti-semitic, pro-German far-right politic circles while in Dublin, engaging with the likes of Gearóid Ó Cuinneagáin and George Griffith. Indeed alongside Griffith Moylett was deeply involved with the founding of the People's National Party, an explicitly anti-Jewish Pro-Nazi party whose membership overlapped greatly with that of the Irish Friends of Germany. Moylett only left the People's National Party when in October 1939 he was expelled from the party and his position as treasurer on charges of embezzling party funds. In 1941 he continued to support these far-right groups when he aided Ó Cuinneagáin in setting up the Youth Ireland Association, a group gathered to fight "a campaign against the Jews and Freemasons, also against all cosmopolitan agenda". When the group was found to be stealing guns from army reservists the Gardai had enough and shut the group down in September 1942.

He died in 1973.

References

External links
Irish bureau of Military History www.bureauofmilitaryhistory.ie/reels/bmh/BMH.WS0767.pdf

 

1878 births
1973 deaths
Early Sinn Féin politicians
Irish far-right politicians
Irish fascists
Irish Republican Army (1919–1922) members
Members of the Irish Republican Brotherhood